Walking on Water is a 2002 Australian drama film directed by Tony Ayres. The film explores the grief, tenderness, stupidity and humour that arises from death.

Plot summary
When Gavin is finally buried after dying of AIDS, his close friends Charlie and Anna find themselves at odds regarding the way he died. In the weekend that passes, Gavin's estranged family come to stay, which only adds more tension to the strained household. As Charlie tries to cling to his distant partner Frank, and Anna begins a sexual affair with Gavin's married brother, the pair realize now that Gavin has gone and there is no one to keep them together, or even keep them in line.

Cast

Awards
Walking on Water won five Australian Film Institute awards and the Teddy Award for Best Feature Film at the 2002 Berlin International Film Festival.

Box office
Walking on Water grossed A$350,532 at the box office in Australia.

See also
Cinema of Australia

References

External links

 
Walking on Water at Oz Movies

2002 films
Australian comedy-drama films
2000s English-language films
Films directed by Tony Ayres
Films set in Sydney
Films shot in Sydney
2002 comedy-drama films
Australian LGBT-related films
2002 LGBT-related films
LGBT-related comedy-drama films
2000s Australian films